Julia Faye Maloney (September 24, 1892 – April 6, 1966), known professionally as Julia Faye, was an American actress of silent and sound films. She was known for her appearances in more than 30 Cecil B. DeMille productions. Her various roles ranged from maids and ingénues to vamps and queens.

She was "famed throughout Hollywood for her perfect legs" until her performance in Cecil B. DeMille's The Volga Boatman (1926) established her as "one of Hollywood's popular leading ladies."

Early life
Faye was born at her grandmother's home near Richmond, Virginia. Her father, Robert J. Maloney (born  1865), worked for the Atchison, Topeka and Santa Fe Railway. Her mother, Emma Louise Elliott (1872–1955), was from New Castle, Indiana. Her parents had married in 1890 in Newton, Kansas. Faye's paternal grandfather, Thomas Maloney, was born in Ireland and had immigrated to the United States in the 1850s.

Faye's father died sometime before 1901, when her widowed mother married Cyrus Demetrios Covell (1862–1941) in Indiana. Faye took her stepfather's name and listed him as her father.

She had lived in St. Louis, Missouri, prior to coming to Hollywood in 1915, to visit friends. She visited one of the film studios and was introduced to actor and director Christy Cabanne. The two reminisced about St. Louis and discovered that they had lived next door to one another there. Cabanne persuaded Faye's reluctant mother to allow her to be in motion pictures.

Career

Triangle, Fine Arts, and Keystone (1915–1916)

Faye made her debut in silent films with bit roles in Martyrs of the Alamo and The Lamb, both directed by Christy Cabanne for Triangle Film Corporation in 1915. Her first credited and important role was as Dorothea opposite DeWolf Hopper's Don Quixote in the 1915 Fine Arts adaptation of the famous Miguel de Cervantes novel. Neil G. Caward, a reviewer for the film journal Motography, wrote, in his review of Don Quixote, that "both Fay Tincher as Dulcinea and Julia Faye as Dorothea add much enjoyment to the picture." Faye's growing popularity increased with her appearances in several Keystone comedies, including A Movie Star, His Auto Ruination, His Last Laugh, Bucking Society, The Surf Girl, and A Lover's Might, all released in 1916. She also worked for D. W. Griffith, who gave her a minor role in Intolerance (1916).

Famous Players-Lasky (1917–1925)
Faye's first role for Cecil B. DeMille was featured in The Woman God Forgot (1917). She continued working for DeMille in The Whispering Chorus, Old Wives for New, The Squaw Man and Till I Come Back to You (all 1918).

In 1919, Faye played the stenographer in Stepping Out. Cast with Enid Bennett, Niles Welch, and Gertrude Claire, Faye was complimented by a critic for playing her role with "class". In DeMille's Male and Female (1919), she played Gloria Swanson's maid.

Her next film, It Pays To Advertise (1919), was a Paramount Pictures release adapted by Elmer Harris from the play of the same name by Rol Cooper Megrue and Walter Hackett. It was directed by Donald Crisp. Faye was among the actors with Lois Wilson depicting the leading lady.

Faye was listed as a member of the Paramount Stock Company School in July 1922. Its noteworthy personalities included Rudolph Valentino, Gloria Swanson, Betty Compson, Wallace Reid, Bebe Daniels, and Pola Negri.

In 1923, she played The Wife of Pharaoh, one of her most famous roles, in the prologue of DeMille's The Ten Commandments.

Faye joined Raymond Griffith and ZaSu Pitts in the screen feature Changing Husbands (1924), a Leatrice Joy comedy adapted from a magazine story entitled Roles.

DeMille Pictures Corporation (1925–1927)
When DeMille resigned as director general of Famous Players-Lasky, in January 1925, he became the production head of Cinema Corporation of America. He planned to direct two or three films per year and supervise the making of between ten and twenty more. Faye came along with him as did Joy, Rod La Roque, Florence Vidor, Mary Astor, and Vera Reynolds.

The Volga Boatman (1926) was directed by DeMille and named for the noted Russian song. William Boyd, Elinor Fair, and Faye have primary roles in a production DeMille called "his greatest achievement in picture making." Faye's depiction of a "tiger woman" was esteemed as the most captivating of her career, to this point. Before this role she had been known for "silken siren roles". Theodore Kosloff played opposite her as a stupid blacksmith.

Faye played Martha in The King of Kings (1927). Christ, portrayed by H.B. Warner, is introduced with great majesty in the DeMille photodrama. A blind child searches for the Lord and the producer/director turns the camera gradually down to the child's eyes. The viewer sees Christ initially like the blind child whose sight is restored. Faye traveled to New York City for personal appearances in association with The King of Kings and to address a sales convention in Chicago, Illinois.

Faye won critical acclaim for her leading performance in the 60-minute silent comedy Turkish Delight (1927), directed by Paul Sloane for DeMille Pictures Corporation. She was featured as Velma in the 1927 DeMille-produced film adaptation of the play Chicago; she has the distinction of being the first actress to portray Velma on-screen.

Sound films (1928–1957)
Faye had a small role as an inmate in DeMille's The Godless Girl (1929), which featured some talking sequences, but she made her "talkie" debut playing Marcia Towne in DeMille's first sound film, Dynamite (1929), co-starring Conrad Nagel, Kay Johnson, and Charles Bickford. Dynamite was also her first Metro-Goldwyn-Mayer film. She also appeared in two other MGM productions, the Marion Davies comedy Not So Dumb (1930) and DeMille's third and final remake of The Squaw Man (1931), before her brief retirement from films in the early 1930s.

After a short-lived marriage, Faye returned to films with a minor role in Till We Meet Again (1936) and would go on to appear in every one of DeMille's films after Union Pacific (1939), which marked her return to DeMille films. In Samson and Delilah (1949), she had a prominent supporting role as Delilah's maidservant, Hisham. In The Ten Commandments (1956), she played Elisheba, Aaron's wife. Her last role was as a dowager in the 1958 remake of DeMille's The Buccaneer, produced by DeMille himself but directed by his son-in-law Anthony Quinn.

Personal life

Faye married Harold Leroy Wallick on August 2, 1913, in Manhattan. Wallick predeceased her, and she is listed as a widow in the 1930 census.

Faye first met Cecil B. DeMille in 1917 and became one of his mistresses. In 1920, Faye resided at 2450 Glendower Avenue in Los Feliz. She later bought a Colonial Revival-style mansion at 2338 Observatory Avenue, also in Los Feliz.

Faye married screenwriter Walter Anthony Merrill on October 24, 1935, in Los Angeles. In April 1936, she announced that she had obtained a Nevada divorce from Merrill. 

Faye began writing a memoir, Flicker Faces, in the mid-1940s. Although it remains unpublished, some excerpts from the memoir are included in author Scott Eyman's 2010 biography of DeMille, Empire of Dreams: The Epic Life of Cecil B. DeMille.

Death
Faye died of cancer at her home in Pacific Palisades, Los Angeles, on April 6, 1966, at the age of 73. Her cremated remains rest in the Colonnade at Hollywood Forever Cemetery.

Legacy
For her contributions to the American film industry, Faye was awarded a star on the Hollywood Walk of Fame at 6500 Hollywood Boulevard. Her memoir, preserved in The Cecil B. DeMille Archives at Brigham Young University, has yet to be published.

Partial filmography

 The Lamb (1915) in a minor role (uncredited)
 Don Quixote (1915) as Dorothea
 Intolerance (1916) in a bit role (uncredited)
 A Roadside Impresario (1917) as Adelaide Vandergrift
 The Woman God Forgot (1917) as Tecza's handmaiden
 The Whispering Chorus (1918) as Girl in Shanghai Dive (uncredited)
 Old Wives for New (1918) as Jessie
 Sandy (1918) as Annette Fenton
 Till I Come Back to You (1918) as Susette
 Mrs. Leffingwell's Boots (1918) as Mabel Brown
 The Squaw Man (1918) as Lady Mabel
 Venus in the East (1919) as Doric Blint
 Don't Change Your Husband (1919) as Nanette aka Toodles
 A Very Good Young Man (1919) as Kitty Douglas
 Stepping Out (1919) as The Secretary
 Male and Female (1919) as Susan – Maid #2
 It Pays to Advertise (1919) as Countess de Beaurien
 The Six Best Cellars (1920) as Mrs. Jordan
 Why Change Your Wife? (1920) as Girl in Bathing Suit (uncredited)
 Something to Think About (1920) as Alice Blair – Banker's Daughter
 Life of the Party (1920) as 'French' Kate
 Forbidden Fruit (1921) as Mrs. Mallory's First Maid
 The Snob (1921) as Betty Welland
 The Great Moment (1921) as Sadi Bronson
 The Affairs of Anatol (1921) as Tibra (uncredited)
 Fool's Paradise (1921) as Samaran, His Chief Wife
 A Trip to Paramountown (1922, Short) as herself
 Saturday Night (1922) as Elsie Prentiss
 Nice People (1922) as Hallie Livingston
 Manslaughter (1922) as Mrs. Drummond
 Nobody's Money (1923) as Annette
 Adam's Rib (1923) as The Mischievous One
 The Ten Commandments (1923) as The Wife of Pharaoh – Prologue
 Don't Call It Love (1923) as Clara Proctor
 Hollywood (1923) as herself
 Triumph (1924) as Countess Rika
 The Breaking Point (1924) as Gossipy Patient (uncredited)
 Changing Husbands (1924) as Mitzi
 Feet of Clay (1924) as Bertha Lansell
 The Golden Bed (1925) as Nell Thompson
 Hell's Highroad (1925) as Anne Broderick
 The Road to Yesterday (1925) as Dolly Foules
 The Volga Boatman (1926) as Mariusha, a Gypsy
 Bachelor Brides (1926) as Pansy Short
 Meet the Prince (1926) as Princess Sophia Alexnov
 Corporal Kate (1926) as Becky Finkelstein
 The King of Kings (1927) as Martha
 His Dog (1927) as Dorcas
 The Fighting Eagle (1927) as Josephine
 The Main Event (1927) as Margie
 Turkish Delight (1927) as Zelma
 Chicago (1927) as Velma
 The Godless Girl (1929) as Inmate #1
 Dynamite (1929) as Marcia Towne
 Not So Dumb (1930) as Mrs. Forbes
 The Squaw Man (1931) as Mrs. Chichester Jones
 Only Yesterday (1933) (uncredited)
 Till We Meet Again (1936) as Nurse
 You and Me (1938) as Secretary
 Union Pacific (1939) as Mame
 The Spellbinder (1939) as Courtroom Extra (uncredited)
 Remember the Night (1940) as Jury Member (uncredited)
 Northwest Mounted Police (1940) as Wapiskau
 Pacific Blackout (1941) as Dance Club Woman (uncredited)
 Reap the Wild Wind (1942) as Charleston Lady
 Holiday Inn (1942) as Guest at Inn (uncredited)
 So Proudly We Hail! (1943) as Nurse (uncredited)
 The Story of Dr. Wassell (1944) as Anne, the Nurse (uncredited)
 Casanova Brown (1944) as X-Ray Nurse (uncredited)
 Masquerade in Mexico (1945) as Party Guest (uncredited)
 To Each His Own (1946) (uncredited)
 California (1947) as Wagon Woman
 Easy Come, Easy Go (1947) as Neighbor (uncredited)
 Fear in the Night (1947) as Rental Home Owner (uncredited)
 Blaze of Noon (1947) as Hatchet-Faced Wife (uncredited)
 Welcome Stranger (1947) as Townswoman (uncredited)
 The Perils of Pauline (1947) as Nurse (uncredited)
 Unconquered (1947) as Widow Swivens
 The Big Clock (1948) as Secretary (uncredited)
 Mr. Reckless (1948) as Wedding Guest (uncredited)
 Beyond Glory (1948) as Motherly Churchgoer (uncredited)
 Night Has a Thousand Eyes (1948) as Companion (uncredited)
 Joan of Arc (1948) as Townswoman (uncredited)
 Alias Nick Beal (1949) as Reformer (uncredited)
 A Connecticut Yankee in King Arthur's Court (1949) as Lady Penelope
 Red, Hot and Blue (1949) as Julia – Housekeeper
 Song of Surrender (1949) as Bidder (uncredited)
 Chicago Deadline (1949) as Nurse (uncredited)
 Samson and Delilah (1949) as Hisham
 The Lawless (1950) as Mrs. Jensen
 Where Danger Lives (1950) as Nurse Seymour (uncredited)
 Sunset Boulevard (1950) as Hisham (uncredited)
 Copper Canyon (1950) as Proprietor's Wife (uncredited)
 Here Comes the Groom (1951) as Passenger on Airplane (uncredited)
 The Greatest Show on Earth (1952) as Birdie
 The Ten Commandments (1956) as Elisheba
 The Buccaneer (1958) as Dowager at Sale

References

External links

 
 
 Julia Faye at Virtual History
 Autographed portrait of Faye(archived)

1892 births
1966 deaths
20th-century American actresses
American film actresses
American silent film actresses
American people of English descent
American people of Irish descent
Burials at Hollywood Forever Cemetery
Deaths from cancer in California
Actresses from Richmond, Virginia
People from Los Feliz, Los Angeles